The Société Royale Belge de Géographie (In English, the Royal Belgian Geographical Society) or SRBG, is a Belgian learned society which works to promote geographical sciences.

History 
The Société was founded on 27 August 1876 as the Belgian Society of Geography a few days before the opening of the Brussels Geographic Conference to promote the exploration of various parts of the world.  It was initially involved with commercial investment in Belgian colonies.  In 1882 King Leopold II authorised the society to use the prefix "Royal".  Although it was later funded privately Adrien de Gerlache first unveiled his plans for the Belgian Antarctic Expedition to the society in 1894.

In 1900 the society had more than one thousand members including several explorers such as the American, Richard Mohun.  By the middle of the twentieth century the society had changed its objectives from exploration to scientific research and study.  The SRBG represents Belgium in the European Society of Geography and publishes the Belgian Journal of Geography, now branded as Belgeo.  The SRBG awards a gold medal to noted geographers and explorers.

Presidents 
 Count Hippolyte d'Ursel.

See also

References

Bibliography 
issued by the society
 Bulletin de la Société Belge de Géographie, 1876-1881
 Bulletin de la Société Royale Belge de Géographie, 1882-1961
 Revue belge de géographie, 1962-1999

about the society

External links
Official homepage 

1876 establishments in Belgium
Geography of Belgium
Geographic societies
Organizations established in 1876
Organisations based in Belgium with royal patronage
Learned societies of Belgium